Kannad (Assembly constituency) is one of the six constituencies of Maharashtra Vidhan Sabha located in the Aurangabad district.

It is a part of the Aurangabad (Lok Sabha constituency) along with five other assembly constituencies, viz Vaijapur Assembly constituency, Gangapur Assembly constituency, Aurangabad East Assembly constituency, Aurangabad Central Assembly constituency and Aurangabad West Assembly constituency

Members of Legislative Assembly

Election results

Assembly Elections 2004

Assembly Elections 2009

Assembly Elections 2014

Assembly Elections 2019

See also
 Vaijapur

References

Assembly constituencies of Maharashtra
Year of establishment missing